William Esco Moerner (born June 24, 1953) is an American physical chemist and chemical physicist with current work in the biophysics and imaging of single molecules. He is credited with achieving the first optical detection and spectroscopy of a single molecule in condensed phases, along with his postdoc, Lothar Kador. Optical study of single molecules has subsequently become a widely used single-molecule experiment in chemistry, physics and biology. In 2014, he was awarded the Nobel Prize in Chemistry.

Early life and education 
Moerner was born in Pleasanton, California, in 1953 June 24 the son of Bertha Frances (Robinson) and William Alfred Moerner. He was a boy scout, with the Boy Scouts of America and became an Eagle Scout. He attended Washington University in St. Louis for undergraduate studies as an Alexander S. Langsdorf Engineering Fellow, and obtained three degrees: a B.S. in physics with Final Honors, a B.S. in electrical engineering with Final Honors, and an A.B. in mathematics summa cum laude in 1975.  This was followed by graduate study, partially supported by a National Science Foundation Graduate Research Fellowship, at Cornell University in the group of Albert J. Sievers III. Here he received an M.S. degree and a Ph.D. degree in physics in 1978 and 1982, respectively. His doctoral thesis was on vibrational relaxation dynamics of an IR-laser-excited molecular impurity mode in alkali halide lattices.  Throughout his school years, Moerner was a straight A student from 1963 to 1982, and won both the Dean's Award for Unusually Exceptional Academic Achievement as well as the Ethan A. H. Shepley Award for Outstanding Achievement when he graduated from college.

Career and work 
Moerner worked at the IBM Almaden Research Center in San Jose, California, as a Research Staff Member from 1981 to 1988, a Manager from 1988 to 1989, and Project Leader from 1989 to 1995.  After an appointment as Visiting Guest Professor of Physical Chemistry at ETH Zurich (1993–1994), he assumed the Distinguished Chair in Physical Chemistry in the Department of Chemistry and Biochemistry at the University of California, San Diego, from 1995 to 1998.  In 1997 he was named the Robert Burns Woodward Visiting Professor at Harvard University. His research group moved to Stanford University in 1998 where he became Professor of Chemistry (1998), Harry S. Mosher Professor (2003), and Professor, by courtesy, of Applied Physics (2005).  Moerner was appointed Department Chair for Chemistry from 2011 to 2014.  His current areas of research and interest include: single-molecule spectroscopy and super-resolution microscopy, physical chemistry, chemical physics, biophysics, nanoparticle trapping, nanophotonics, photorefractive polymers, and spectral hole-burning.  As of May 2014, Moerner was listed as a faculty advisor in 26 theses written by Stanford graduate students.  As of May 16, 2014, there are 386 publications listed in Moerner's full CV.

Recent editorial and advisory boards Moerner has served on include: Member of the Board of Scientific Counselors for the National Institute of Biomedical Imaging and Bioengineering (NIBIB); Advisory Board Member for the Institute of Atomic and Molecular Sciences, Academica Sinica, Taiwan; Advisory Editorial Board Member  for Chemical Physics Letters; Advisory Board Member for the Center for Biomedical Imaging at Stanford.; and Chair of the Stanford University Health and Safety Committee.

Awards and honors 
Moerner is the recipient of a number of awards and honors.  They include: National Winner of the Outstanding Young Professional Award for 1984, from the electrical engineering honorary society, Eta Kappa Nu, April 22, 1985; IBM Outstanding Technical Achievement Award for Photon-Gated Spectral Hole-Burning, July 11, 1988; IBM Outstanding Technical Achievement Award for Single-Molecule Detection and Spectroscopy, November 22, 1992; Earle K. Plyler Prize for Molecular Spectroscopy, American Physical Society, 2001; Wolf Prize in Chemistry, 2008; Irving Langmuir Award in Chemical Physics, American Physical Society, 2009; Pittsburgh Spectroscopy Award, 2012; Peter Debye Award in Physical Chemistry, American Chemical Society, 2013; the Engineering Alumni Achievement Award, Washington University, 2013; and the Nobel Prize in Chemistry, 2014.  Moerner also holds more than a dozen patents.

His honorary memberships include Senior Member, IEEE, June 17, 1988, and Member, National Academy of Sciences, 2007.  He is also a Fellow of the Optical Society of America, May 28, 1992; the American Physical Society, November 16, 1992; the American Academy of Arts and Sciences, 2001; and the American Association for the Advancement of Science, 2004.

Personal life 
Moerner was born on June 24, 1953, at Parks Air Force Base in Pleasanton, California. From birth, his family called him by his initials W. E. as a way to distinguish him from his father and grandfather who are also named William. He grew up in Texas where he attended Thomas Jefferson High School in San Antonio.  He participated in many activities during high school: Band, Speech and Debate, Math and Science Contest Team, Bi-Phy-Chem, Masque and Gavel, National Honor Society, Boy Scouts, Amateur Radio Club, Russian Club, Forum Social Club, Toastmasters, "On the Spot" Team and Editor of Each has Spoken.  Moerner and his wife, Sharon, have one son, Daniel.

References

External links 
 Chemistry Tree: William E. Moerner Details
 W. E. Moerner Laboratory Homepage at Stanford University
 W. E. Moerner Profile at Stanford University
 Google Scholar Profile for W. E. Moerner
 Microsoft Academic Search pagefor W. E. Moerner
 List of Nobel laureates affiliated with Washington University in St. Louis
 Description of Moerner's work: Alumni Alumni Achievement Award from Washington University
 

People from San Antonio
Jefferson High School (San Antonio, Texas) alumni
Cornell University alumni
Stanford University Department of Chemistry faculty
1953 births
Living people
Washington University in St. Louis alumni
Wolf Prize in Chemistry laureates
Spectroscopists
Microscopists
Members of the United States National Academy of Sciences
American physical chemists
American Nobel laureates
Nobel laureates in Chemistry
Nobel laureates affiliated with Missouri
Fellows of Optica (society)
Fellows of the American Physical Society
Fellows of the American Academy of Arts and Sciences
Fellows of the American Association for the Advancement of Science
American people of German descent
People from Los Altos, California
Washington University physicists
Washington University in St. Louis mathematicians
Stanford University faculty
University of California, San Diego faculty
Chemical physicists